Ottleya strigosa, synonyms Lotus strigosus and Acmispon strigosus, is a flowering plant in the pea family (Fabaceae), native to the southwestern United States and northern Mexico. It is known as stiff-haired lotus or strigose bird's-foot trefoil.

Description
Ottleya strigosa is a prostrate annual herb. It is sometimes roughly hairy as its name suggests, but it may be somewhat woolly, fuzzy, or nearly hairless as well. Its slender branches are lined with leaves each made of several small leaflets. The leaves are 1/2" to 1" long. They are pinnately divided, with 4-9 obovate, alternate, leaflets, on a flattened rachis. The inflorescence bears one or two yellow to orange or red pealike flowers, each with a corolla one half to one centimeter across. The fruit is a legume pod 1 to 3 centimeters long.

Distribution and habitat
It is native to the southwestern United States (California and Nevada) and northern Mexico, where it is known from many types of habitat, including disturbed areas.

References

External links
Jepson Manual Treatment
USDA Plants Profile
Photo gallery

Loteae
Flora of California
Flora of Nevada
Flora of Northwestern Mexico
Flora of Northeastern Mexico
Flora without expected TNC conservation status